Baland Mosque, which means the "upper mosque", is a historical mosque in the ancient city of Bukhara, Uzbekistan. Registered as a World Heritage Site by UNESCO along with the whole of the historic old town, this small mosque was built at the beginning of the 16th century in the southern part of the city.

Architecture

It has a prayer room for each of the winter and the summer. The first is located inside the cubic building, with an iwan outside and richly decorated interior mosaics inside. The winter room is adorned with frescoes, mosaics, gilding with floral themes. The ceiling is covered with ornate planks. A hexagonal frieze with golden inscriptions runs up the walls under the ceiling. The iwan serves as a summer prayer room. The columns of the iwan are adorned with decor of muqarnas made of wood. The ceiling and columns of the iwan date from the 19th century.

See also
List of mosques in Uzbekistan

References

16th-century mosques
Mosques in Bukhara